Milford High School may refer to:
Milford High School (Connecticut) - a former high school in Milford, Connecticut (1842-1983)
Milford High School (Delaware) — Milford, Delaware
Milford High School (Massachusetts) — Milford, Massachusetts
Milford High School (Michigan) — Highland, Michigan
Milford High School (New Hampshire) — Milford, New Hampshire
Milford High School (Ohio) — Milford, Ohio
Milford High School (Texas) — Milford, Texas
New Milford High School (Connecticut) — New Milford, Connecticut
New Milford High School (New Jersey) — New Milford, New Jersey
West Milford High School — West Milford, New Jersey